Johan Frederik Kobberup Andersen (24 January 1920 – 7 May 2003) was a Danish sprint canoeist from Aarhus who competed in the late 1940s and early 1950s. He won a silver medal in the K-1 1000 m event at the 1948 Summer Olympics in London.

Andersen also won a complete set of medals at the ICF Canoe Sprint World Championships with a gold (K-1 500 m: 1950), a silver (K-1 4 x 500 m: 1950), and a bronze (K-1 4 x 500 m: 1948).

References

1920 births
2003 deaths
Canoeists at the 1948 Summer Olympics
Danish male canoeists
Olympic canoeists of Denmark
Olympic silver medalists for Denmark
Olympic medalists in canoeing
ICF Canoe Sprint World Championships medalists in kayak
Sportspeople from Aarhus

Medalists at the 1948 Summer Olympics